The Tomb of Dai Anga, also known as the Gulabi Bagh, is a 17th-century Mughal tomb complex located in the Mughal-era suburb of Begampura, outside the Walled City of Lahore, Pakistan.

Background

The mausoleum was built in honour of Dai Anga, the wet nurse of Shah Jahan, and wife of Murad Khan of Bikaner. It is located along the Grand Trunk Road on one of the former routes between Lahore and Delhi. It is also located close to the 17th century tomb of Hazrat Ishaan, and the 18th century Cypress Tomb.

History

The tomb of Dai Anga features a gateway that predates the tomb's construction. Built in 1655 C.E. by the Persian nobleman Mirza Sultan Baig, the gateway was originally the entrance to a pleasure garden. The original garden was square in shape, and had measured 250 Guz on each side.
 
In 1671 C.E., the pleasure garden was repurposed into a tomb for the wet-nurse of the Mughal Emperor Shah Jahan, and wife to Murad Khan, magistrate of Bikaner under the Emperor Jehangir. A new mausoleum was constructed in the centre of the garden, which over the centuries has been encroached upon by neighbouring structures, with only a narrow strip of garden between the tomb and gateway remaining.

Architecture
The mausoleum is rectangular in shape with eight rooms encircling the perimeter of a central chamber. The entire mausoleum is on a raised plinth. A dome with frescoes is directly above the central chamber. The chamber itself is empty, as the actual tomb of Dai Anga lies below in a subterranean crypt. She is buried next to her daughter Sultana Begum. Both cenotaphs have been removed, and the subterranean chamber is no longer accessible to the public.

The central change is richly decorated with carved inscriptions from the Quran, as well as elegant frescoes made by the renowned calligrapher Muhammad Saleh. The exterior of the tomb was also once covered in rich kashi kari, or Qashani tile-work, though much of the tiles have been lost through the centuries.

Conservation
The tomb complex is listed on the Protected Heritage Monuments of the Archaeology Department of Punjab.

Impact of Metro construction
The tomb is situated along the planned route of the Orange Line of the Lahore metro. Heritage campaigners submitted a petition to the Lahore High Court as the planned metro line will pass close to the tomb, Shalimar Gardens, and nine other sites in the city in violation of the Punjab Special Premises Ordinance, 1985 and Antiquity Act, 1975. In August 2016, the Court halted construction of the metro within 200 feet of any heritage site, including the tomb in order to prevent what UNESCO termed as potentially "irreversible damage," were the line to be constructed in its present form.

Gallery

References

External links

1671 establishments in India
Religious buildings and structures completed in 1671
Mausoleums in Punjab, Pakistan
Architecture of Lahore
Tombs in Lahore
Mughal tombs
Mughal gardens in Pakistan